Mark Anthony Lacsamana Fernandez (born January 18, 1979) is a Filipino actor. He is the son of actor Rudy Fernandez and actress-politician Alma Moreno.

Career
He first rose to prominence when he was once a former member of one of the famous showbiz teen group, "Gwapings" alongside Jomari Yllana, Eric Fructuoso, and later with Jao Mapa.

His breakout roles in the movies includes Pare Ko, Mangarap Ka and Matimbang Pa sa Dugo which featured him as a lead star. In 1996, he received Best Actor and Best Supporting Actor nominations for the 3 aforementioned movies he did. However, the year 1998 started a downward spiral in Fernandez's career and personal life following an assault case that was filed against him by an American socialite and the break-up with his then-girlfriend Claudine Barretto. His home studio Regal Films attempted to launch him as an action star in the movies Sonny Segovia: Lumakad Ka Sa Apoy and Walang Katumbas Ang Dugo but both movies flopped at the box-office.

After a two-year hiatus from a drug rehabilitation which follows his acquittal in the assault case, Fernandez returned in the movie scene via Biyaheng Langit and Dos Ekis opposite sexy actresses Joyce Jimenez and Rica Peralejo, respectively. He also made a TV comeback via GMA drama series Ikaw Lang ang Mamahalin opposite Angelika dela Cruz.

In 2003, he had disappeared once again from the industry and underwent rehabilitation for drug dependence for the second time. In 2005, he was released from rehab and made his comeback in show business. After his release in rehab, he said in his words, "I hope the moviegoers will welcome me back. Now, I realize more than ever that I'm made for showbiz and I'll always be in showbiz."

He has been one of GMA Network's leading actors with his critically acclaimed performances on TV series such as Impostora (2007), Kamandag (2007–08), Ako si Kim Samsoon (2008), Luna Mystika (2008–09), All About Eve (2009) and Munting Heredera. He also portrayed Manny Pacquiao in Magpakailanman in 2003 before his second drug rehab.

His role as Nicolas Cayetano is the drama series Impostora, became his most notable role in TV and he said drama also relaunched his career making him one of the sought-after leading men in GMA-7 and because of the fruitful projects given to him by GMA, he decided to sign an exclusive contract with the network that rebuilt his career. He was paired off with Sunshine Dizon (Impostora), Heart Evangelista (Luna Mystika), Iza Calzado (All About Eve), Marian Rivera (Darna) and Regine Velasquez (Ako si Kim Samsoon and recently in Diva, 2010).

He also hosted a kids documentary reality show Kap's Amazing Stories Kids Edition last April 2010 on GMA Network.

In January 2018, Fernandez returned to showbiz after legal issues. He signed a contract with Viva Artist Agency. after 12 years, he returned to ABS-CBN via FPJ's Ang Probinsyano.

Personal life
Fernandez married Melissa Garcia in 2006 but have since separated in 2014. They have a son named Grae Cameron.  He is also the nephew of action star and senator Robin Padilla; Mark's father Daboy is Robin's cousin.

On 3 October 2016, Fernandez was arrested for marijuana possession after attempting to elude a police checkpoint in Angeles, Pampanga. He has stated he smokes marijuana "to prevent cancer". after a year, on 23 December 2017, Fernandez had been released from jail due to dismissal of drug case against him.

Filmography

Television

Films

Awards and nominations

References

External links
Mark Anthony Fernandez at iGMA.tv

1979 births
Living people
Filipino male child actors
Filipino male comedians
Filipino male television actors
Filipino people of Chinese descent
Male actors from Manila
Mark
Star Magic
ABS-CBN personalities
GMA Network personalities
Viva Artists Agency
People convicted of drug offenses
Film male child actors
Television male child actors
Filipino male film actors